Harpa davidis, common name the Madras harp or David harp, is a species of sea snail, a marine gastropod mollusk in the family Harpidae, the harp snails.

Distribution
This species is widespread over Indo-Pacific, from eastern Africa to Hawaii and it is present in the South Eastern India and in the Andaman Sea.

Habitat
The Madras harp lives on sublittoral and offshore sandy bottoms at depths of 5 to 250 m.

Description
These shells are usually smoothy and glossy, pale brown or reddish-brown, with strong axial ribs, a wide aperture and characteristic decorative markings. The ventral side of body whorl usually shows two-three large brown blotches, but may also be completely brown.

Bibliography
 Hughes, R.N. and W.K. Emerson.   1987.   Anatomical and taxonomic characteristics of
 HarpaandMorum(Neogastropoda: Harpaidae). Veliger, 29(4):349–358.
 Rehder, H.A.  1973.  The family Harpidae of the world. Indo-Pac. Moll., 3(16):207–274.
 Walls, J.G.  1977.   Another viewpoint on the living harps. The Pariah, 4:1–4.
 Walls, J.G.  1980. Conchs, tibias, and harps. T.F.H., Reigate, 191

References

External links
 

davidis
Gastropods described in 1798